Tanel Padar  (born 27 October 1980) is an Estonian singer and songwriter. He is best known internationally for winning the Eurovision Song Contest 2001. Padar became famous by winning the Kaks takti ette, a biennial televised competition for young Estonian singers, in 1999.

Career
In 1999 Padar won Kaks takti ette a televised competition for young Estonian singers.

In 2000, Padar was one of the backing vocalists for Ines – who at the time was also his girlfriend – at the Eurovision Song Contest 2000.

In 2001, he, along with the boyband 2XL and Aruba-born Dave Benton claimed the spotlight by winning the Eurovision Song Contest 2001 with the song "Everybody".

In 2003 Padar started a rock band called Tanel Padar & The Sun, which is one of the most popular bands in Estonia.

In 2006, Tanel Padar & The Sun had the following positions in the Estonian 2006 chart (top 40): #1, #4, #12, #23, #29, #31. One of their songs also claimed the R2 Hit of the Year prize. The song "Hopelessness You" made it to the MTV World Chart Express.

In 2017, 25.08. Tanel Padar & The Sun gives farewell concert in Kihnu island

In 2017, Padar starts as a solo artist

Personal life
Tanel Padar's older sister is singer Gerli Padar. 

He was married to Katarina Kalda from 2003 until 2007.

He became engaged to Lauren Villmann in 2018. They have two daughters, Linda (2019) and Luna (2022)

Discography

Albums 
 The Greatest Hits (2005)
 Veidi valjem kui vaikus (A bit louder than silence) (2005)
 100% Rock'n'roll (2006)
 The Sun Live 2006 (2007)
 Veidi valjem kui vaikus II (A bit louder than silence II) (2007)
 Here Comes The Sun (2008)
 Unisex (2008)
 RING (2010)
 Veidi valjem kui vaikus III (A bit louder than silence III) (2015)
 Sinu aeg (Your time) (2020)

References

External links

1980 births
Living people
People from Rakvere Parish
Eurovision Song Contest winners
Eurovision Song Contest entrants of 2001
Eurovision Song Contest entrants for Estonia
Estonian pop singers
Estonian rock singers
21st-century Estonian male singers
English-language singers from Estonia
Recipients of the Order of the White Star, 5th Class